Harry Vernon Mercer (March 10, 1889 – June 25, 1945) professionally Jack Mercer, was a Major League Baseball pitcher who played for the 1910 Pittsburgh Pirates in one game on August 2, 1910. Prior to his brief appearance with the Pirates, he played from 1907 to 1910 in the minor leagues.

External links

1889 births
1945 deaths
Pittsburgh Pirates players
Baseball players from Ohio
Major League Baseball pitchers
Springfield Babes (baseball) players
Springfield Reapers players
Marion Diggers players
Peoria Distillers players
Sportspeople from Zanesville, Ohio
Portsmouth Cobblers players